Black Toast Records is a subsidiary company/indie digital record label owned and operated by Black Toast Music.

Founded by Bob Mair in 1991, Black Toast Music is an independent music publisher/production music library located in Los Angeles, California. Since its launch, the company has placed music in television series (including "True Blood," "Dexter," "Treme," and "The Wire," and others), motion pictures (including "Arthur" with Russell Brand, "When In Rome" with Kristen Bell, "I Love You, Phillip Morris" with Jim Carrey, "Dead Silence," "Jiminy Glick in Lalawood," and others). Black Toast has also licensed its artists' music to a variety videogames, national advertising campaigns, internet advertising campaigns, as well as, numerous multi-media presentations.

Due to requests from people who have heard and have been interested in purchasing music represented by the company, Black Toast Music has expanded its artists' outlets by launching the indie digital record label, Black Toast Records.

External links 
 Official Site

American record labels